Bactris elegans is a species of palms which is native to South America (Bolivia, Brazil, Colombia, French Guiana, Guyana and Suriname).

References

External links
 Bactris elegans at The Plant List
 Bactris elegans at Tropicos

elegans
Flora of Bolivia
Flora of Brazil
Flora of Colombia
Flora of French Guiana
Flora of Guyana
Flora of Suriname
Plants described in 1875